Proto is the second solo studio album by Irish musician Leo O'Kelly. It was originally planned for November 2002 but was released on 4 February 2003 by Clarinda & 1st. It contains a collection of previously unreleased tracks recorded from May 1975 to 2001.

Track listing

References

2003 albums
Leo O'Kelly albums